Norman Brookes and Anthony Wilding defeated Arthur Lowe and Gordon Lowe 6–2, 8–6, 6–1 in the All Comers' Final, and then defeated the reigning champions Herbert Roper Barrett and Charles Dixon 6–1, 6–1, 5–7, 8–6 in the challenge round to win the gentlemen's doubles tennis title at the 1914 Wimbledon Championships.

Draw

Challenge round

All comers' finals

Top half

Section 1

Section 2

The nationalities of ST Oppenheimer and WJ Pearse are unknown.

Bottom half

Section 3

Section 4

References

External links

Men's Doubles
Wimbledon Championship by year – Men's doubles